Apocrypha Now is a 1995 role-playing game supplement for Warhammer Fantasy Roleplay published by Hogshead Publishing.

Contents
Apocrypha Now reprints material from old copies of White Dwarf and out-of-print supplements for the first edition.

Reception
Steve Faragher reviewed Apocrypha Now  for Arcane magazine, rating it a 7 out of 10 overall. Faragher comments that "If I have a criticism, it's that not much of the material strikes me as very original. It's vital for all WFRP referees, though."

Reviews
Valkyrie #13 (1997)
Backstab (Issue 1 - Jan/Feb 1997)

References

Fantasy role-playing game supplements
Role-playing game supplements introduced in 1995
Warhammer Fantasy Roleplay